Hao Deqing (1906–1993) was a People's Republic of China diplomat. He was ambassador of the People's Republic of China to Hungary (1954–1961), North Korea (1961–1965), Norway (1971–1972), the Netherlands (1972–1974) and Iran (1974–1977).

1906 births
1993 deaths
National University of Peking alumni
Ambassadors of China to Hungary
Ambassadors of China to North Korea
Ambassadors of China to Norway
Ambassadors of China to the Netherlands
Beijing Normal University alumni
Ambassadors of China to Iran
Delegates to the 6th National People's Congress
Delegates to the 5th National People's Congress